Kailali Multiple Campus is one of the constituent campuses of Far-western University located in Dhangadi of western Nepal. The campus was established in 1980 as a constituent campuses of Tribhuvan University, however the affiliation was changed in 2021 based on government decision.  The campus is recognized by University Grants Commission  since .

History
In the past, Kailali District was considered as one of the most underdeveloped regions of Nepal which forced students to go to Kathmandu or to India for higher studies. To avoid such a situation, the local people established Kailali Commerce Campus. The campus was later renamed Kailali Multiple Campus and was affiliated with Tribhuvan University. The affiliation was changed to Far-western University in 2021.

Infrastructure
The campus has 27 bighas (18 hectare) of land in the eastern part of Dhangadhi.

References

Tribhuvan University
Far-western University
1980 establishments in Nepal